Chusquea laegaardii is a species of  grass in the family Poaceae. The bamboo is endemic to Ecuador. It is an IUCN Red List Vulnerable species.

References

laegaardii
Endemic flora of Ecuador
Grasses of South America
Vulnerable flora of South America
Taxonomy articles created by Polbot
Taxobox binomials not recognized by IUCN